The 2005 UCI Asia Tour was the first season of the UCI Asia Tour. The season began on 16 January 2005 with the Tour of Siam and ended on 19 September 2005 with the Tour de Hokkaido. Andrey Mizurov of Kazakhstan was crowned as the 2005 UCI Asia Tour champion.

Throughout the season, points are awarded to the top finishers of stages within stage races and the final general classification standings of each of the stages races and one-day events. The quality and complexity of a race also determines how many points are awarded to the top finishers, the higher the UCI rating of a race, the more points are awarded.

The UCI ratings from highest to lowest are as follows:
 Multi-day events: 2.HC, 2.1 and 2.2
 One-day events: 1.HC, 1.1 and 1.2

Events

Final standings

Individual classification

Team classification

Nation classification

External links
 

UCI Asia Tour
2005 in road cycling
UCI